Dirk Inzé (born 19 October 1957) is a Belgian molecular biologist and professor at Ghent University (Ghent, Belgium). In 2002, he succeeded Marc Zabeau as scientific director of the VIB-UGent Center for Plant Systems Biology. His research interest is on the molecular networks underpinning yield and organ growth both under standard as well as mild drought stress conditions in Arabidopsis and the C4 crop maize. He is a member of the European Molecular Biology Organization (EMBO). He was recipient of the 1994 Körber European Science Prize. In 2005, he was awarded the Francqui Prize on Biological and Medical Sciences for his research on plant systems biology.

Selected publications
 Gonzalez N, Beemster GT, Inzé D. David and Goliath: what can the tiny weed Arabidopsis teach us to improve biomass production in crops? Curr Opin Plant Biol. 2009. 12:157–64. 
 Skirycz A, Inzé D. More from less: plant growth under limited water. Curr Opin Plant Biol. 2010. 21:197–203.

External links
  Dirk Inze lab at UGent
 Dirk Inze lab at VIB

Living people
Belgian molecular biologists
Academic staff of Ghent University
Systems biologists
1957 births